Dorian's Divorce is a 1916 American silent drama film directed by O. A. C. Lund and starring Lionel Barrymore and Grace Valentine. B. A. Rolfe produced for distribution through Metro Pictures.

Cast
Lionel Barrymore as Richard Dorian
Grace Valentine as Mrs. Dorian
Edgar L. Davenport as Theodore Sanders
William B. Davidson as (credited as William Davidson)
Louis Wolheim as Captain Ross (credited as L. Robert Wolheim)
Lindsay J. Hall as B. G. Holding
Bert Starkey as Puck (credited as Buckley Starkey
John Leach
Jerome N. Wilson (credited as Jerome Wilson)

Preservation status
The film is preserved Cinematheque Francaise.

References

External links

1916 films
American silent feature films
Metro Pictures films
American black-and-white films
Silent American drama films
1916 drama films
Films directed by Oscar A. C. Lund
1910s American films